The Gippsland Lakes Coastal Park is a coastal park in the East Gippsland region of Victoria, Australia.

Location and features
The  park was established in April 1979 and is set on the east coast of Victoria, with its eastern boundary facing Bass Strait and its western boundary facing both The Lakes National Park and the eastern shores of the Gippsland Lakes. The park includes the Ninety Mile Beach. Since 2010, the park has been managed by Parks Victoria jointly with the Gunaikurnai Land and Waters Aboriginal Corporation.

See also
 Ninety Mile Beach Marine National Park
 Protected areas of Victoria (Australia)
 The Lakes National Park

References

External links
 Gippsland Lakes Coastal Park webpage at Parks Victoria website.
 

Coastal parks of Victoria (Australia)
Protected areas established in 1979
1979 establishments in Australia
East Gippsland
Coastline of Victoria (Australia)